The Synge Baronetcy, of Kiltrough in the County of Meath, is a title in the Baronetage of the United Kingdom. It was created on 12 August 1801 for Robert Synge. The third Baronet served as High Sheriff of County Cork in 1844. The family surname is pronounced "Sing". As of 28 February 2014 the present Baronet has not successfully proven his succession and is therefore not on the Official Roll of the Baronetage, with the baronetcy considered dormant since 2011.

Samuel Synge, brother of the first Baronet, succeeded his great-uncle in the Hutchinson Baronetcy, of Castlesallagh in 1813 according to a special remainder in the letters patent. See this title for more information on this branch of the family.

Synge baronets, of Kiltrough (1801)
Sir Robert Synge, 1st Baronet (died 1804)
Sir Edward Synge, 2nd Baronet (1786–1843)
Sir Edward Synge, 3rd Baronet (1809–1884)
Sir Noah Hill Neale Synge, 4th Baronet (1811–1886)
Sir Robert Synge, 5th Baronet (1812–1894)
Sir Francis Robert Millington Synge, 6th Baronet (1851–1924)
Sir Robert Millington Synge, 7th Baronet (1877–1942)
Sir Robert Carson Synge, 8th Baronet (1922–2011)
Sir Allen James Edward Synge, 9th Baronet (born 1942)

See also
Hutchinson Baronetcy, of Castlesallagh

References
Notes

Bibliography
Kidd, Charles, Williamson, David (editors). Debrett's Peerage and Baronetage (1990 edition). New York: St Martin's Press, 1990.

Synge